The City of Englewood is a home rule municipality located in Arapahoe County, Colorado, United States. The town population was 33,659 at the 2020 United States Census. Englewood is a part of the Denver–Aurora–Lakewood, CO Metropolitan Statistical Area and the Front Range Urban Corridor. Englewood is located immediately south of Denver in the South Platte River Valley.

History

The recorded history of Englewood began in 1858, when gold was discovered on what came to be called Little Dry Creek by William Green Russell, an early settler of the High Plains. Two years later, Thomas Skerritt, considered to be the founder of the city, established a home in the area, which was called Orchard Place. Four years later, the first road connecting Denver and Orchard Place was created by Skerritt himself, using his own plough. In 1879, the first telephone arrived in the area.

In 1883, the Cherrelyn horsecar path was laid. The Cherrelyn trolley was and is an important city icon, being carried up Broadway by horse and down by gravity. The city was incorporated in 1903, but Skerritt was edged out by J.C. Jones as the first city mayor. Jones was a prominent landowner, having originally owned almost all of what is now north Englewood. The next two years brought the establishment of the first newspaper in the city, soon to be named the Herald. In 1905, Swedish National Sanitorium was founded, soon to become the massive present-day Swedish Medical Center.  The first pavement and street lights were installed in 1906, and a year later, the police and fire departments were established. In 1908, the Cherrelyn horse trolley stopped running.

A great period of change for the city occurred in 1948;  on the Platte Canyon were purchased, and soon McLellan Reservoir was created. This ensured water independence from the powerful Denver Water, and in fact, Englewood provides water to most of the south metro area now due to its vast, early established water rights. Soon after, the city embarked on a huge building boom; most of the city was in fact built up by 1960.

In 1965, City Park was sold to make way for Cinderella City, the largest mall west of the Mississippi River and one of the largest in the world when it opened in 1968.  The developer provided the funds to create a vast city park network to replace the single City Park on which the mall was built.  About 30 years later, the city demolished the defunct mall  to make way for a new, transit-oriented development that would also contain a new Civic Center, library, and the relocated city hall.  The RTD completed its southwest light-rail corridor in 2000, and established passenger rail transit in Englewood.

In 2004, Englewood opened the Pirates Cove water park as part of a multimillion-dollar improvement package for the city parks system.  In addition to Pirates Cove, many improvements were made to the South Platte River trail system and the Englewood Recreation Center, originally constructed in 1975.

Englewood is a full-service city with its own, independent park, library, and public works systems.  It provides snowplow service to neighboring municipalities and water to a large portion of the metro area.

Geography
Englewood is located at  (39.646837, -104.991986).

At the 2020 United States Census, the town had a total area of  including  of water.

Climate
Englewood features a climate very similar to that of Denver, but is slightly milder and more stable due to the city's location in a very low part of the South Platte River valley.  Winds are very sparse throughout the city.  The Köppen climate classification labels Englewood as having a cold, semiarid climate,  BSk on climate maps.

Demographics

As of the census of 2000,  31,727 people, 14,392 households, and 7,469 families were residing in the city. The population density was 4,843.8 people/sq mi (1,870.2/km2). The 14,916 housing units 
averagedf 2,276.4/sq mi (879.3/km2). The racial makeup of the city was 87.8% White, 1.5% African American, 1.3% Native American, 1.9% Asian, and 2.6% from two or more races. Hispanics or Latinos of any race were 13% of the population.

Of the 14,392 households, 23.6% had children under the age of 18 living with them, 36.7% were married couples living together, 10.8% had a female householder with no husband present, and 48.1% were not families. About 37.9% of all households were made up of individuals, and 9.5% had someone living alone who was 65 years of age or older. The average household size was 2.15, and the average family size was 2.88.

In the city, the age distribution was 20.3% under 18, 9.6% from 18 to 24, 35.9% from 25 to 44, 20.0% from 45 to 64, and 14.2% who were 65 or older. The median age was 36 years. For every 100 females, there were 98.1 males. For every 100 females age 18 and over, there were 96.4 males.

The median income for a household in the city was $38,943, and for a family was $47,290. Males had a median income of $32,636 versus $28,480 for females. The per capita income for the city was $20,904. About 4.9% of families and 8.2% of the population were below the poverty line, including 9.0% of those under age 18 and 7.5% of those age 65 or over.

Government and infrastructure
The Federal Correctional Institution, Englewood, is named after Englewood, but is not near Englewood. It is in unincorporated Jefferson County.

Civic Center
The Englewood Civic Center is located in the only remaining portion of the Cinderella City Mall. It contains the Englewood Public Library, The Museum of Outdoor Arts, and all city departments, including the courts.

The Englewood Public Library
The Englewood Public Library is a full service library. There are computers for public use, as well as printers and copiers. The Library also has a small section on Colorado and Englewood history, a microfiche collection, and an archive of local history. The Cherrelyn Horse Car can be viewed in front of the library.

Neighborhoods
Central Englewood can be roughly divided into quadrants, divided by Hampden Avenue and Broadway.  The northwest is the oldest section of the city, containing the new City Center, downtown, and housing stock dating to the 1910s.  This is also where the massive General Iron metal fabrication plant was located, which closed in the 1990s and has now been demolished, awaiting redevelopment and a new proposed light-rail station at Bates Avenue.  The southwest section is home to a newer housing stock, as well as a significant percentage of Englewood's industrial and production facilities.

The southwest side also features Belleview Park, its largest park, and a small reservoir.  The southeast section is almost purely residential, and is newer than the north and southwest sides.  Finally, northeast Englewood is home to one of the largest hospital complexes in the metro area. Swedish Medical Center and Craig Hospital, a top-10, nationally ranked rehabilitation hospital for spinal cord and traumatic brain injury rehabilitation, comprise the hospital district, the backbone of the city economy. The Hampden Hills neighborhood hosts one of the largest conglomeration of apartment complexes in the metro area, and is also the newest developed part of the city, as well as the wealthiest.

Englewood also features some large annexed areas, such as the northwest annex that extends to Evans Avenue in Denver, which is chiefly manufacturing and industry.  Finally, Englewood extends southeast to the Highline Canal, and southwest past Federal Blvd. approaching the town of Bow Mar.

Education
Most of the City of Englewood is served by the Englewood Public Schools. Small parts of the city are served by the Littleton Public Schools and the Sheridan Public Schools. Some of neighboring Cherry Hills Village is within the Englewood school district.

The Englewood district has two high schools: Englewood High and Colorado's Finest High School Of Choice. The two middle schools are Englewood Middle School and Englewood Leadership Academy. The four elementary schools are Bishop, Clayton, Charles Hay, and Cherrelyn. 

The city is also home to a number of private schools, including the Saint Louis School, a large Catholic K-12 institution and All Souls School serving grades K-8.  Also, the city used to host the Denver Seminary, an evangelical graduate-level religious school that has since relocated to Littleton.  The former seminary site has been redeveloped into residential apartments and retail. Englewood is also the location of Humanex Academy, a private, alternative middle and high school for students who have learning disabilities and emotional and behavior disorders.

Economy
Business process outsourcing company TTEC is based in Englewood.

Top employers
According to the city's 2017 Comprehensive Annual Financial Report, the top employers in the city are:

Points of interest
 Merrill Wheel-Balancing System

Adjacent municipalities and unincorporated areas

The place name "Englewood" is assigned to four ZIP codes (80110, 80111, 80112, 80113) which covers areas adjacent to the city on the west and east, and an area southeast of the city that is much larger than the city itself. Thus, many addresses written as "Englewood, Colorado" are actually in the Arapahoe County cities of Sheridan, Cherry Hills Village, Greenwood Village, or Centennial; or in Meridian in unincorporated Douglas County. This area includes part of the Denver Tech Center and the surrounding commercial development along the I-25 corridor, which is often erroneously attributed to Englewood; the city actually lies several miles west.

Notable people

Notable individuals who were born in or have lived in Englewood include missionary and archaeologist David Crockett Graham, civil rights activist Carlotta Walls LaNier, and railroad executive Louis W. Menk.

See also

Colorado
Bibliography of Colorado
Index of Colorado-related articles
Outline of Colorado
List of counties in Colorado
List of municipalities in Colorado
List of places in Colorado
List of statistical areas in Colorado
Front Range Urban Corridor
North Central Colorado Urban Area
Denver-Aurora, CO Combined Statistical Area
Denver-Aurora-Lakewood, CO Metropolitan Statistical Area

References

External links

City of Englewood website
CDOT map of the City of Englewood

 
Populated places established in 1903
Cities in Arapahoe County, Colorado
1903 establishments in Colorado
Cities in Colorado